Malbank School is a comprehensive secondary school and sixth form in Nantwich, Cheshire with pupils of both sexes aged from 11 to 18.

Location
It is situated close to Nantwich's boundary with Henhull, on the north side of Welsh Row (part of the Nantwich-Chester road), and east of the Shropshire Union Canal.

History

Grammar school
Malbank School originates in three schools. The oldest is the original Nantwich Grammar School, first recorded in 1572, but believed to have been founded in around 1560. The original schoolhouse was in the churchyard of St Mary's Church. In 1860 the school amalgamated with the Blue Cap Charity School, which was founded in around 1700, to form the new Nantwich Grammar School, and moved to 108 Welsh Row, where the former schoolhouse and headmaster's house still stands. In 1885, it combined with Acton Grammar School, becoming Nantwich and Acton Grammar School or NAGS. It moved to its present site in 1921 in buildings designed by Harry Beswick. The horses on the school coat of arms were added purely because of the NAGS acronym.In 1960, the school celebrated its 400th anniversary, with the Duchess of Gloucester attending the school prize-giving on 18 November 1960. On the occasion, the Nantwich Guardian reported that the "school of ancient history had turned into one of the most up-to-date in the County, catering for all the widely varying needs of individual children."

Comprehensive
Nantwich and Acton Grammar School became a comprehensive school in 1977. The name later changed to Malbank School and Sixth Form College. The Nantwich and Acton symbol still remains in the logo of the two horses' heads, an emblem found on many important school objects.

In 2010, the school celebrated its 450th anniversary with a full school ceremony and visit from the Duke of Gloucester on 26 April 2010.

In September 2011, the £1.2 million Olympic Boulevard building was opened, housing a health and fitness centre, conference facilities, cafeteria, Starbucks coffee and IT facilities widely used by the whole school. VIP guests at the opening included Bryony Page, Paralympics Committee chairman Sir Philip Craven and Paralympians Claire and Scott Robertson.

Sixth form
The Sixth Form, which has its own "building" within the school, takes applicants mainly from Crewe and Nantwich but also takes students from the surrounding Cheshire area. Students will normally take three or four "A-levels", occasionally two, and receive the opportunity to undertake an Extended Project Qualification (EPQ), but there are also limited BTEC courses which are intended be taken with certain A-level choices.

Notable former pupils
 Antony Jenkins, banker 
 Hayley Jones (athlete), world medallist in athletics 4 × 100 m relay, 2013 
 Ben Miller, comedian
 Stephen Eichhorn, materials scientist
 Bryony Page, trampoline silver medallist at 2016 Olympics and bronze medallist at 2020 Olympics
 Sophie Reade, winner of Big Brother'', 2009
 Ashley Westwood, footballer formerly at Crewe Alexandra and Aston Villa, now at Burnley

Nantwich and Acton Grammar School
 Alan Astbury, Professor of Physics at the University of Victoria from 1983–2000, Rutherford Medal and Prize 1986, President of the International Union of Pure and Applied Physics (IUPAP) from 2005-8
 Prof Harry Berry, Professor of Pharmaceutics at the School of Pharmacy, University of London from 1944–56
 John Boyer , Chief Executive of the Zoological Society of London from 1984-8
 Ian Cowap (1950-2016), cricketer
 Roger Flemington, NatWest executive and President of the Chartered Institute of Bankers (CIB) from 1991-2
 Dame Maeve Fort, High Commissioner to South Africa from 1996–2000, Ambassador to Mozambique from 1989–92 and to the Lebanese Republic from 1992-6
 Sir Kenneth Mather  geneticist, Professor of Genetics at the University of Birmingham from 1971–84 and 1948–65, and Vice-Chancellor of the University of Southampton from 1965–71
 Air Vice-Marshal Leslie Moulton CB DFC, Station Commander of RAF Cosford from 1961-3
 Dr Ronald Newport, Head of the Daresbury Laboratory (in Cheshire) from 1995-6
 Anthony Trickett , Lord Lieutenant of Orkney since 2007
 Sir Andrew Witty, Chief Executive of GlaxoSmithKline (world's 4th largest pharmaceutical company) since 2008 (school was comprehensive for his last five years)
 Mike Wood, Labour MP for Batley and Spen 1997–2015

References

External links
 School and College website

Secondary schools in the Borough of Cheshire East
Educational institutions established in the 1560s
1560 establishments in England
Foundation schools in the Borough of Cheshire East